Dario Conte (born November 2, 1997) is a Canadian soccer midfielder.

Playing career

Youth
Conte began playing soccer at the age of four with AS Laval before moving to Ottawa the following year. In Ottawa, he played for Ottawa South United until the age of 17. He went on trial for several clubs, including Crewe Alexandra, Peterborough United and Blackpool before finally joining the Vancouver Whitecaps U18 Academy after a successful trial in February 2015. He was then released by the Whitecaps at the end of the season and returned to Ottawa to join Ottawa Fury Academy.

Ottawa Fury
On 11 June 2016, Conte made his senior debut for the Fury in a 1–1 draw versus Rayo OKC, coming on as a substitute for captain Julian de Guzman.

OSU Force
In 2017, Conte joined the senior team of his youth club, Ottawa South United, in League1 Ontario. That season, he made three appearances and scored one goal. The following season Conte rejoined OSU, scoring three goals in six appearances.

Reading United
In summer 2019, Conte played for American USL League Two side Reading United AC and made three appearances that season.

Ottawa South United
In 2020, he returned to Ottawa South United, playing for them in the Première Ligue de soccer du Québec.

International career
Conte was one of six Ottawa Fury Academy players called to a Canadian U20 identification camp in Laval in September 2015.

Career statistics

References

External links

1997 births
Living people
Association football midfielders
Canadian soccer players
Soccer players from Montreal
Canadian people of Italian descent
Canadian expatriate soccer players
Expatriate soccer players in the United States
Canadian expatriate sportspeople in the United States
Vancouver Whitecaps Residency players
Ottawa Fury FC players
Carleton Ravens men's soccer players
Reading United A.C. players
Première ligue de soccer du Québec players
North American Soccer League players
League1 Ontario players
USL League Two players
Ottawa South United players